The Poet Laureate of Idaho or Writer in Residence is the poet laureate for the U.S. state of Idaho. After 1982 the title was changed to Writer in Residence.

Idaho Poets Laureate
 Irene Welch Grissom (1923-1948) 
 Sudie Stuart Hager (1949-1982)

List of Writers in Residence
 Ron McFarland (1984-1985)  
 Robert Wrigley (1986-1987)  
 Eberle Umbach (1988-1989)  
 Neidy Messer (1990-1991) 
 Daryl Jones (1992-1993) 
 Clay Morgan (1994-1995) 
 Lance Olsen (1996-1998) 
 Bill Johnson (1999-2000) 
 Jim Irons (2001-2004) 
 Kim Barnes (2004-2006) 
 Anthony Doerr (2007-2010) 
 Brady Udall (2010-2013) 
 Diane Raptosh (2013-2016) 
 Christian Winn (2016-2019) 
 Malia Collins (2019-2021) 
 CMarie Fuhrman (2021–present)

External links
Poets Laureate of Idaho at the Library of Congress

See also

 Poet laureate
 List of U.S. states' poets laureate
 United States Poet Laureate

References

 
Idaho culture
American Poets Laureate